Anna Prodromou (born 26 June 1972) is a Cypriot communications & DEI consultant, speaker and educator. She is also the founder of the organization Women in Conflict Zones.

Early life
Prodromou was born and raised in Nicosia, Cyprus. Both of her parents are of Cypriot origin, and her mother lives in Nicosia. Her father died in 2010.

She holds a degree in French language and literature from the University of Cyprus and an MSc in communication and journalism from Open University of Cyprus.

Career
She has worked as a project manager on several NGO projects, one of which received a Stelios Haji-Ioannou Award in 2011. She has worked since 2012 as a local news producer for the German television network ZDF. After leaving Cyprus, she lived in Athens, Greece, and New Canaan, Connecticut, US.  She is the founder of the organization Women in Conflict Zones (WICZ), which concerns women's civic participation and contribution to civil society. She was also a co-founder of Faros Association, a non-profit organization formed to support AIDS and H.I.V. positive persons and their families. Prodromou is an executive committee member of Join2Media, Her volunteer work has included Faros Association (CY), UCYVoice (CY) and Person to Person, P2P (USA).

Prodromou was featured as an Expert in the ‘She Experts’ initiative of the Mediterranean Institute of Gender Studies (MIGS), She is also the winner of the 12th Cyprus (National) Business Woman of the Year Award 2018, Corporate Category. Her book "Women in Conflict Zones" was published in January 2019 and launched in April 2019.

References 

1972 births
Living people
Cypriot businesspeople
Cypriot mass media people
Cypriot women
People from Nicosia
University of Cyprus alumni